Dawn is a far-left Slovak political party formed in May 2005 as a split from the Communist Party of Slovakia (KSS). It is led by Ivan Hopta. Hopta was excluded from the KSS because of personal conflicts. The party publishes a magazine called Dawn (Úsvit), which seems to be its only activity. The party's main base is the Eastern Slovak town of Humenné, where Hopta lives. Dawn is considered to be orthodox-communist.

References

External links
Party website 
Old party website 

2005 establishments in Slovakia
Communist parties in Slovakia
Political parties established in 2005
Political parties in Slovakia